Dolotovo is a rural locality (a village) in Pertsevskoye Rural Settlement, Gryazovetsky District, Vologda Oblast, Russia. The population was 2 as of 2002. There are 2 streets.

Geography 
Dolotovo is located 24 km northwest of Gryazovets (the district's administrative centre) by road. Sannikovo is the nearest rural locality.

References 

Rural localities in Gryazovetsky District